Pineda de Mar is a municipality in the comarca of the Maresme in Catalonia, Spain. It is situated on the coast between Calella and Santa Susanna. The main N-II road and a RENFE railway line run through the town.

The town centre has several historical buildings from the 17th to the 19th centuries. Four arches survive of a Roman aqueduct over the Pineda river.

Demography

Twin towns
  Frontignan, France

Image Gallery

References

 Panareda Clopés, Josep Maria; Rios Calvet, Jaume; Rabella Vives, Josep Maria (1989). Guia de Catalunya, Barcelona: Caixa de Catalunya.  (Spanish).  (Catalan).

External links

 Government data pages 
Historic-artistic heritage 

Municipalities in Maresme
Populated coastal places in Spain